William John Garvelink (born May 22, 1949) is an American diplomat and former United States Ambassador to the Democratic Republic of the Congo by George W. Bush on May 30, 2007 and sworn in on October 22, 2007.

Biography

Early life and education 
Garvelink was born in Holland, Michigan and graduated from Calvin College (B.A.) in 1971 and the University of Minnesota (M.A.); along with post-graduate studies at the University of North Carolina in Latin American history, but ran out of money before earning his Ph.D. Garvelink joined the United States Agency for International Development (USAID) in 1979.

Career 
Before he joined AID, Garvelink was a professional staff member of the Subcommittee on International Organizations and the Committee on Foreign Affairs of the U.S. House of Representatives. Garvelink's responsibilities included oversight of USAID’s worldwide humanitarian assistance and democracy programs. Offices within the Bureau for Democracy, Conflict and Humanitarian Assistance include the Office of Foreign Disaster Assistance, Office of Transition Initiatives, Office of Food for Peace, Office of Democracy and Governance, Office of Conflict Management and Mitigation and the Office of Private and Voluntary Cooperation. He is a Minister Counselor of the Senior Foreign Service.

Prior to his appointment as ambassador, Garvelink served since 1999 as the USAID Mission Director in Eritrea. He administered a development and relief program worth more than $55 million US dollars.

Garvelink has received six Performance Awards, two Meritorious Honor Awards, a Superior Honor Award, and a Senior Foreign Service Presidential Meritorious Service Award over his service with the U.S. Department of State.

In 1988 until 1999 Garvelink served in Office of Foreign Disaster Assistance (OFDA), first as the Assistant Director for Response and then as the Deputy Director. While in OFDA, he directed relief operations in Africa, Asia, Latin America, the Near East, Europe and in the former Soviet Union. Garvelink led many Disaster Assistance Response Teams, or DARTs, to parts of Albania, Armenia, Democratic Republic of the Congo, Haiti, Iraq, Kenya, Rwanda, Somalia and Iran. He chaired the USAID Task Force for the 2004 Indian Ocean Tsunami, the Task Force for the Pakistani Earthquake and the Lebanese Task Force.

Prior to his work in the OFDA, Garvelink served for two years in the Department of State’s Bureau for Population, Refugees and Migration with responsibilities for much of southern Africa. He was appointed for four years in Bolivia for USAID and served for three years as a staff member of the House Foreign Affairs Committee.

Personal life 
Garvelink is married to Linda A. Garvelink, whom he met in high school, and is a banking industry specialist.

Published works
Garvelink has written many published works, including:

Humanitarian Assistance Intervention in Complex Emergencies: Information Requirements in the 1990s*
Complex Emergencies in Africa in the 1990s: The Role of Technology*
Special Report: United States Response to the Earthquake in Bam, Iran*

*edited by Jim Whitman and David Pocock, St. Martin's Press, Inc., 1996

*in Meeting the Challenge of International Peace Operations: Assessing the Contribution of Technology, edited by Alex Gliksman (proceedings of a conference sponsored by the Center for Global Security Research, June 1998 and held in Livermore, California September 9–10, 1996)

*in The Liaison (Journal of Civil-Military Humanitarian Relief Collaboration), Volume 3, Number 2, 2004

References

External links

Ambassadors of the United States to the Democratic Republic of the Congo
Calvin University alumni
University of Minnesota alumni
Living people
1949 births
United States Foreign Service personnel